Michael F. Drissel  (December 19, 1864 – February 26, 1913), was a professional baseball player who played catcher in the Major Leagues for the 1885 St. Louis Browns.

External links

1864 births
1913 deaths
Major League Baseball catchers
St. Louis Browns (AA) players
19th-century baseball players
Baseball players from Missouri